The energy sector in Hawaii has rapidly adopted solar power due to the high costs of electricity, and good solar resources, and has one of the highest per capita rates of solar power in the United States.
Hawaii's imported energy costs, mostly for imported petroleum and coal, are three to four times higher than the mainland, so Hawaii has motivation to become one of the highest users of solar energy. Hawaii was the first state in the United States to reach grid parity for photovoltaics. Its tropical location provides abundant ambient energy.

Much of Hawaii's solar capacity is distributed solar panels on individual homes and businesses. Hawaii's grid has had to deal with this unique situation by developing new technology for balancing the energy flows in areas with large amounts of solar power. In 2017 distributed solar produced 913GWh which was 36% of all renewable energy produced in the state and about 9% of electricity sales. Utility-scale solar produced 212GWh, just over 1% of sales. In December 2016, Hawaii had 674MW of installed distributed solar capacity. The largest utility-scale solar farm in Hawaii is the 49 MW Kawailoa Solar project which opened in September 2019.

History
Hawaii has a renewable portfolio standard of 40% renewable energy by 2030 and 100% by 2045. Hawaii had almost 200 MW of grid-connected photovoltaics in 2012. 16 MW of PV were installed in 2010, 40 MW in 2011, and 109 MW in 2012.

The electrical grids of the Hawaiian islands are each separate and relatively small. "Overbuilding" distributed solar in some areas has led to issues such as partial duck curve, although time-of-use pricing has reduced disadvantages. Such overbuilding led the Hawaiian Electrical Company (HECO) to stop its net metering program, which reimbursed solar consumers generously for the excess electricity they exported back to the grid, in 2015. As a result, residential solar installations fell as homeowners could no longer justify the costs because the payback time of the rooftop solar system made it cost-prohibitive.  Two successor programs - customer grid supply (CGS) and customer self-supply - have proved less successful than net-metering did in promoting the growth of the industry. HECO has made connecting to the grid more difficult, leading to layoffs among the solar installation industry. In 2014, there were over 40,000 rooftop systems, over 10 percent of customers. A proposed grid interconnection between Oahu and Maui would have allowed more renewable energy but was rejected as too costly. By 2022, nearly a third of single family homes have solar panels.

HECO has limited homeowners' ability to install solar and connect to the grid. As of 2022, the only program available for private systems to supply power to the grid, Customer Grid Supply Plus, has limited capacity and requires inverters that meet HECO specifications. Approved inverters must allow the company to remotely turn off power transmission to the grid as needed. The utility has gone full steam ahead with its own plans to build utility-scale solar, approving 110 MW on July 27, 2017.

Cyanotech has a 0.5 MW solar array on its algae farm at the Natural Energy Laboratory of Hawaii.

In October, 2018, Hawaii Electric Companies announced they were negotiating contracts on 7 new solar farms to total 260 MW, each incorporating 4 hours of battery storage:
These would be three projects on Oahu, two projects on Maui and two projects on Hawaii. In March 2019, six projects (totalling 247 MW and almost 1 GWh of battery storage) were approved, priced at 8-10c/kWh.

Sunrun is establishing a virtual power plant on Oahu which would use the energy stored in 1000 batteries located in individual houses with rooftop solar panels to deliver power in times of high energy demand on the grid. This system is expected to be online in 2020. These types of services provide not only additional power to the power grid but also add grid stability.

Kauai
Kauai has rapidly adopted solar. In 2009, oil provided 91% of the island's electricity. In 2015, solar provided 15% with other renewables providing another 22% with oil providing 63%. On some days in 2016, solar power provided 77% of the electricity generation on Kauai.

When it opened on November 2, 2015 on Kauai, the 12MW Anahola project was the largest solar project in Hawaii. The Anahola project also incorporates a 6MW lithium-ion battery. The 12 MW Kapaia solar plant is connected to a 13 MW / 52 MWh battery, and the power is priced at 13.9 c/kWh. A 2018 project for 28 MW solar with 20 MW / 100 MWh batteries is priced at 11 c/kWh. A 44MW solar farm with batteries to be completed in 2019 will bring the island to 70% renewable electricity while a pumped-storage hydro facility is under consideration which could bring the island to 90% renewable by 2023.

Statistics
In 2012 a typical solar system in Hawaii paid for itself in only 4 years, and returned a profit of over 4 times the cost over its life. Hawaii's 35% ($5000.00 Maximum) state tax credit is the second highest in the country, behind Louisiana. Hawaii offers a feed-in tariff, but it does not meet the normal definition of a feed-in tariff, as it is less than the retail cost of electricity, and is therefore simply a Power Purchase Agreement. The Oahu Wind Integration Study released a report detailing the impact on the Oahu grid and found that 500 MW of wind and 100 MW of solar power could provide Oahu up to 25% of its electricity while eliminating the need to burn approximately 2.8 million barrels of low sulfur fuel oil and 132,000 tons of coal each year.

In 2010 Hawaii generated 56 GWh of energy by photovoltaics, and 559 GWh in 2014.

This was 0.07% of the state's total electricity generation for 2007, 0.13% for 2008, 0.33% for 2009, 0.51% for 2010, and 1% in 2011. In 2015 solar provided 6% of Hawaii's electricity, and in 2020 15.83%.

Major solar installations in Hawaii

  December 2008: DuPont completed a solar power installation on Kauai that was expected to average 80 kW.
 December 2008: Sunetric, the largest solar installation company in the state, completed the largest roof-mount solar power installation in Hawaii at Kona Commons shopping mall.
 2009: Sopogy completed construction on Hawaii's first concentrating solar power project.  The project located at the Natural Energy Laboratories of Hawaii is a 2 MW solar thermal project interconnected into the Hawaiian Electric Industries grid under a Power Purchase Agreement.
 2009: La Ola Solar Farm on Lanai was dedicated in January, with a design capacity of 1.5 MW (1.2 MWAC). After operating at 600KW due to variable cloud cover, in September 2010 Xtreme Power announced plans to incorporate their battery storage technology to bring the system up to design capacity. It is the first photovoltaic power plant in the world to include battery storage.
 2011: The Kapaa Solar Farm was completed, a 1.21 MW photovoltaic array, the largest in Hawaii, and the first on the island of Kauai.
 2011: Kapolei Sustainable Energy Park on Oahu, 1.18 MW 
 2012: Port Allen Solar Facility on Kauai, 6 MW photovoltaic array with 3 MW battery storage.
 2012: Pearl City Peninsula Solar, Pearl Harbor Navy Base, 1.23 MW
 2012: Kalaeloa Solar Power II, 5 MW, a photovoltaic array on Oahu.
 2013: Kalaeloa Renewable Energy Park, 5 MW, a photovoltaic array on Oahu.
 2014: Koloa (Grove Farm) 12 MW photovoltaic array, opened in July 2014 on Kauai.
 2015: Anahola, 12 MW photovoltaic array with 6 MW battery storage on Kauai, can produce 20% of Kauai's power during peak production.
 2016: Waihonu Solar Farm North, 5MW and Waihonu Solar Farm South, 1.5 MW, Oahu
 2017: Waianae Solar, 40 MWDC (27.6 MWAC), Oahu
 2017: Kapaia solar project, 13 MW, with 52 MWh Tesla battery, on  Kauai, to provide electricity only during the evenings
 2017: Waipio Solar, Pearl Harbor Navy Base, 13.3 MWDC (11 MW(AC))
 2017: Aloha Solar, 5 MWAC, at Nanakuli, Oahu
 2018: Kihei Solar Farm, 2.9 MW, Maui
 2018: Ku'ia Solar, 2.8 MW, Maui 
2019: Lāwa’i Solar (AES), 28 MW with 100 MWh storage, Kauai
 2019:  Mililani II Solar, 14.7 MW, Oahu
 2019:  Waipio Solar project, 45.9 MW, Oahu
 2019:  Kawailoa Solar project, 49 MW, Oahu

Projects under development
 Kauai – Pacific Missile Range Facility, U.S. Navy, 19 MW, with 70 MWh battery storage, expected completion end of 2019
 Molokai – Molokai New Energy Partners, 2.7 MW with 3 MWh battery, to be completed in 2019
 Oahu – Lanikuhana Solar, 15 MW, to be completed 2019, Sun Edison project revived by NRG
 Oahu – Pearl Harbor West Loch Annex, 20 MW, began construction April 2018
 Oahu - Hoohana Solar 1, 52MW with 208MWhr storage
 Oahu - Mililani I Solar, 39MW with 156MWhr storage
 Oahu -  Mililani Tech Solar project, 0.27MW, proposed as first community solar project in Hawaii
 Oahu - Waiawa Solar, 36MW with 144MWhr storage
 Hawaii - Waikoloa Solar, 30MW with 120MWhr storage
 Hawaii - Hale Kuawehi, 30MW with 120MWhr storage
 Maui - Kuihelani Solar, 60MW with 240MWhr storage

Canceled projects
 Oahu – Ka La Nui Solar Farm, 15 MW
 Oahu – Waiawa Solar, 50 MW
 Oahu – Mililani South Solar Park, 20 MW
 Oahu – IC Sunshine, 5 MW
 Oahu – Hoohana Solar, 20 MW

Source:

See also

Wind power in Hawaii
Energy in Hawaii
Solar power in the United States
Renewable energy in the United States

References

External links

Hawaii Department of Business, Economic Development & Tourism
Hawaii Clean Energy Initiative
Hawaii's Energy Future
Hawaii Energy
Hawaii Solar Energy Association
Map of Solar Projects
Solar Hawaii
History of Solar Power in Hawaii Timeline

Hawaii
Energy in Hawaii
Solar power in Hawaii